Harjanne is a surname. Notable people with the surname include:

Atte Harjanne (born 1984), Finnish politician
Samuel Harjanne (born 1987), Finnish actor, voice actor, and singer
Seppo Harjanne (born 1948), Finnish rally co-driver